Milorad B. Protić (19 September 1911, Belgrade – 29 October 2001, Belgrade) was a Serbian astronomer, discoverer of comets and minor planets, and three times director of the Belgrade Observatory.

He is credited by the Minor Planet Center with the discovery of 7 numbered asteroids during 1936–1952, including 1675 Simonida, named after queen Simonida, wife of medieval Serbian king Stefan Milutin, and 2348 Michkovitch, a rare Erigone asteroid named after Vojislav Mišković (1892–1976), who was a member of the Serbian Academy of Sciences and Arts and head of the Belgrade Observatory. Protić also independently discovered comet C/1947 Y1.

He died on 29 October 2001 in Belgrade. The main-belt asteroid 22278 Protitch, discovered by Henri Debehogne at ESO's Chilean La Silla site in 1983, was named in his memory. Naming citation was published on 30 December 2001.

Also, the outer main-belt asteroid 1724 Vladimir is named after Protić's grandson, while 5397 Vojislava is named after Vojislava Protić-Benišek, his daughter, who has been a member of the observatory's staff since 1972, where she continues her father's work on celestial mechanics and minor planets, together with her son.

See also 
 :Category:Erigone asteroids

References

External links 
 OBITUARY MILORAD B. PROTI´C
 Kosmička Srbija između Marsa i Jupitera at naslovi.net

1911 births
2001 deaths
Discoverers of asteroids

Missing middle or first names
Scientists from Belgrade
Serbian astronomers